Area code 600 is a telephone area code in the North American Numbering Plan for non-geographic use in Canada of specialized telecommunication services such as telex applications, caller-pays cellular, ISDN, and mobile satellite communication services.

One of the area code's most common uses is the provision of satellite phone service in remote areas of Northern Canada where conventional telecommunications infrastructure is not available.

Central office prefixes for area code 600 are assigned according to a special set of guidelines issued by the Canadian Radio-television and Telecommunications Commission. The guidelines do not define the services that qualify for the non-geographic numbers, but specify that:

The teletypewriter services provided with the area code were previously provisioned with area code 610 in the Teletypewriter Exchange Service (TWX) in 1962. The services were reassigned to area code 600 in 1992, returning 610 to the pool of unassigned area codes for general purposes. It was reassigned in 1994 to Pennsylvania.

Area code 600 has a capacity of 798 central office prefixes (200 to 999, with 555 and 911 not issued). Six relief area codes (622, 633, 644, 655, 677 and 688) are reserved by NANPA as subject to assignment in Canada for expansion of non-geographic services but have never been used. Area code 666 is not assigned. Each block of 10,000 numbers is assigned to one carrier only; number portability or number pooling is not practiced. A carrier offering multiple, different non-geographic services may request separate prefixes for each.

See also 
 Telephone numbers in Canada

References

External links 
 Non-geographic Telephone Codes for North America
 CSCN Assignment Guidelines: Service Area Code (SAC) 600 NXX Code Assignment (April 13, 1994). Archived from original on August 28, 2006 via Wayback Machine. Retrieved September 7, 2019.

600